The Colts–Texans rivalry is a professional American football rivalry in the National Football League (NFL) between the Indianapolis Colts and the Houston Texans. While being one of the newest rivalries in the NFL due to the Texans' formation in 2002 and the Colts' reallocation to the AFC South division that year, this rivalry has increased in intensity over the late 2010s despite being lopsided in favor of Indianapolis during the 2000s.

Though Colts fans generally view the Texans simply as a divisional opponent, many Texans fans see the Colts as their top rival due to their long period of dominance in the series. Indianapolis won the first nine games in the series as they were a perennial Super Bowl contender under quarterback Peyton Manning while the Texans struggled in their first years in the NFL, finally attaining their first winning season in 2009 and becoming a playoff contender through much of the 2010s. Since then, the Colts and Texans have often squared off for the top spot in their division.

The Colts lead the overall series, 32–10–1.  The two teams have met once in the postseason, with the Colts winning 21–7 in the 2018 Wild Card round.

History

Formation of the Texans and the AFC South
Houston's first NFL Team was the Houston Oilers, who had moved to Memphis, Tennessee and later Nashville, Tennessee to become the Tennessee Titans. Bob McNair then spearheaded an effort to get the NFL to create an expansion team in Houston to replace the Oilers and even out the league's teams at 32. In 1999, the NFL officially awarded the 32nd franchise to McNair. The Texans began playing in 2002.

The formation of the Texans necessitated the reorganization of the league's divisions. The AFC South was created with the Texans joining as an expansion team, the Titans and Jacksonville Jaguars joining from the former AFC Central, and the Colts joining from the AFC East. The Titans and Jaguars were already rivals coming into the division, but the Colts and Texans would have to develop new divisional rivalries, as Indianapolis would leave behind its old rivalries from the AFC East, including a developing rivalry with the New England Patriots.

2002–2010
Efforts for Houston to develop any heated rivalries in the 2000s were for naught, as the Texans were one of the NFL's bottom tier teams for much of their first nine years of playing. Indianapolis, on the other hand, was one of the NFL's powerhouses, featuring a stellar offense with quarterback Peyton Manning and receivers Marvin Harrison and Reggie Wayne. The Colts won the division 7 out of 9 years during this period and managed to make the playoffs each time.

The Colts and Texans first met on September 22, 2002, at Reliant Stadium in Houston, with Manning passing for 272 yards and two touchdowns while Texans rookie quarterback David Carr struggled, only amassing 99 yards, an interception, and a 47.3 passer rating as the Colts routed the Texans 23–3. The Colts wound up winning each of the first nine meetings between the teams, including a 49–14 victory at the RCA Dome in 2004, before Houston finally beat Indianapolis in week 16 of the 2006 season. Peyton Manning wound up having a 16–2 record against the Texans while with the Colts before being released and signing with the Denver Broncos after sitting out the 2011 season due to injury.

2011–2020: Fight for AFC South supremacy
The Texans routed the Manning-less Colts 34–7 in Houston in during opening day of the 2011 season, but were upset during the rematch in Indianapolis after Colts backup quarterback Dan Orlovsky completed a last-minute pass to Reggie Wayne for a touchdown, allowing Indianapolis to win 19–16. By the second game, both starting quarterbacks had been placed on injured reserve for the teams; in addition to Manning missing the whole season, Texans starter Matt Schaub had been sidelined with a Lisfranc injury, forcing rookie T. J. Yates to play in his stead. Nonetheless, the Colts suffered a 2–14 season without Manning, while the Texans still made the playoffs despite Schaub missing the last six games of the season, winning the AFC South for their first division title and playoff berth in franchise history.

The Colts then obtained the first overall pick in the 2012 NFL draft, which they then used to select Stanford quarterback and Houston native Andrew Luck to fill in the void left by Manning. The Texans dominated the Colts during Luck's first game in the rivalry, clinching a second consecutive divisional title with the 29–17 win in week 15 of 2012. However, this would be Indianapolis' last divisional loss until 2015, as the Colts would win the next six in a row against Houston. Houston broke the streak with a 16–10 win at Lucas Oil Stadium on October 8, 2015, which was the first time the Texans beat the Colts on the road, ironically with longtime Texans receiver Andre Johnson on the Colts. The following year, quarterback Brock Osweiler led the Texans to their first ever season sweep of the Colts in his only season with Houston.

Despite the growing animosity between the two teams, many players and executives from the Colts organization helped the Texans with donations and fundraising in the aftermath of Hurricane Harvey at the start of the 2017 season. After both teams struggled in 2017, they met in the playoffs for the first time the following season. Houston had won the division thanks to strong play from quarterback Deshaun Watson and the defense, while Indianapolis had overcome a 1–5 start, including a 37–34 overtime loss to the Texans in which new head coach Frank Reich called a failed fourth-down conversion that ultimately led to Houston's game-winning field goal, to clinch a wild-card berth at 10–6. The Colts won the game thanks to effective play from Luck, running back Marlon Mack, and their defense, keeping Houston scoreless until the fourth quarter with a 21–7 win. Prior to the playoff game, there had been some banter between Colts receiver T. Y. Hilton and several members of the Texans defensive secondary, as Hilton was called a "clown" after making disparaging comments about the Texans.

In 2019, the Texans and Colts were both in position to contend for the AFC South title, despite Indianapolis losing Andrew Luck to a sudden retirement prior to the season. The Colts won the first meeting 30–23 thanks to four touchdown passes from new quarterback Jacoby Brissett, but the Texans won 20–17 in week 12 thanks to two touchdown passes from Watson to receiver DeAndre Hopkins.

2021–present
After a disappointing 2020 season for Houston, which included two close losses to the Colts and Hopkins being traded prior to the season, the Texans released star defensive end J. J. Watt per his request, leading to him joining Hopkins with the Arizona Cardinals, and Deshaun Watson requested a trade before being accused by several women of sexual assault, leading to his deactivation throughout the 2021 season and eventual trade to the Cleveland Browns. While the Texans struggled again in 2021, the Colts, however, maintained a level of success playing with veteran quarterbacks Philip Rivers and Carson Wentz in 2020 and 2021, respectively.

The two teams met in week 1 of the 2022 season, with Matt Ryan now under center for Indianapolis and Davis Mills entering his second year as the Texans' starting quarterback. Houston jumped to a 20–3 lead in the third quarter, but Ryan led Indianapolis back to tie the game by the end of regulation. The game would end in a 20–20 tie as Colts kicker Rodrigo Blankenship missed the potential game-winning field goal, leading to his release after the game. This was the first tie in the series and the first tie in Texans history.

Season-by-season results

|-
| 
| style="| 
| style="| Colts  19–3
| style="| Colts  23–3
| Colts  2–0
| Texans join the NFL as an expansion team.  Both teams placed in the AFC South following 2002 NFL realignment.  
|-
| 
| style="| 
| style="| Colts  30–21
| style="| Colts  20–17
| Colts  4–0
| 
|-
| 
| style="| 
| style="| Colts  49–14
| style="| Colts  23–14
| Colts  6–0
| Colts' 49–14 win is the biggest blowout in the series history (35 points)
|-
| 
| style="| 
| style="| Colts  31–17
| style="| Colts  38–20
| Colts  8–0
| 
|-
| 
| Tie 1–1
| style="| Colts  43–24
| style="| Texans  27–24
| Colts  9–1
| Colts win nine straight meetings (2002–06), Texans record first win over Colts. Colts win Super Bowl XLI.
|-
| 
| style="| 
| style="| Colts  38–15
| style="| Colts  30–24
| Colts  11–1
| 
|-
| 
| style="| 
| style="| Colts  33–27
| style="| Colts  31–27
| Colts  13–1
| 
|-
| 
| style="| 
| style="| Colts  20–17
| style="| Colts  35–27
| Colts  15–1
| Colts lose Super Bowl XLIV.
|-

|-
| 
| Tie 1–1
| style="| Colts  30–17
| style="| Texans  34–24
| Colts  16–2
| Final starts by Colts QB Peyton Manning in series
|-
| 
| Tie 1–1
| style="| Colts  19–16
| style="| Texans  34–7
| Colts  17–3
| 
|-
| 
| Tie 1–1
| style="| Colts  28–16
| style="| Texans  29–17
| Colts  18–4
| 
|-
| 
| style="| 
| style="| Colts  25–3
| style="| Colts  27–24
| Colts  20–4
| 
|-
| 
| style="| 
| style="| Colts  17–10
| style="| Colts  33–28
| Colts  22–4
| Colts win 13 straight meetings in Indianapolis (2002–14) 
|-
| 
| Tie 1–1
| style="| Texans  16–10
| style="| Colts  27–20
| Colts  23–5
| Texans record first road win over Colts.
|-
| 
| style="| 
| style="| Texans  22–17
| style="| Texans  26–23(OT)
| Colts  23–7
| Texans' first and, to date, only season sweep of Colts.
|-
| 
| style="| 
| style="| Colts  22–13
| style="| Colts  20–14
| Colts  25–7
| Only season from 2009–2019 that neither team won the AFC South.
|-
| 
| Tie 1–1
| style="| Texans  37–34(OT)
| style="| Colts  24–21
| Colts  26–8
| Texans capitalize off Colts' failed fourth-down conversion in overtime to set up game-winning FG in Indianapolis.
|- style="background:#f2f2f2; font-weight:bold;"
|  2018 Playoffs
| style="| 
| 
| style="| Colts  21–7
|  Colts  27–8
|  AFC Wild Card playoffs. First playoff meeting between the two teams.  
|-
| 
| Tie 1–1
| style="| Colts  30–23
| style="| Texans  20–17
| Colts  28–9
| 
|-

|-
| 
| style="| 
| style="| Colts  27–20
| style="| Colts  26–20
| Colts  30–9
| Both games ended with Houston driving to tie and/or win in the closing seconds, but Indianapolis forced fumbles to secure both victories.
|-
| 
| style="| 
| style="| Colts  31–3
| style="| Colts  31–0
| Colts  32–9
| 
|- 
| 
| style="| 
| style="| Texans  32–31
| Tie  20–20(OT)
| Colts  32–10–1
| Only tie game in the history of the rivalry, only tie in Texans' franchise history
|- 

|-
| Regular season
| style="|Colts 31–10–1
| Colts 17–4
| Colts 14–6–1
|  
|-
| Postseason
| style="|Colts 1–0
| no games
| Colts 1–0
| 2018 AFC Wild Card playoffs
|-
| Regular and postseason 
| style="|Colts 32–10–1
| Colts 17–4 
| Colts 15–6–1
| 
|-

Connections between the teams 
 Andre Johnson
 Brian Hoyer
 Dan Orlovsky

See also
 National Football League rivalries
 AFC South

References 

Indianapolis Colts
Houston Texans
National Football League rivalries
2002 establishments in the United States
Houston Texans rivalries
Indianapolis Colts rivalries